Luís Otávio Gabus Mendes (born December 22, 1958) in São Paulo) is a Brazilian actor.

Biography 
He is grandson of Otávio Gabus Mendes, son of the telenovelas author Cassiano Gabus Mendes, nephew of the actor Luís Gustavo and brother of the also actor Cássio Gabus Mendes.

Career 
His television debut was in the Ti Ti Ti novel (85), authored by his father, playing Alex, one of the sons of Jacques Leclair (Reginaldo Faria). He then makes an original version of Sinhá Moça (86), as José, a young man who falls in love with the slave Adelaide (Solange Couto).

Later he would work in the novels of his father, like Brega & Chique (87), like Maurício and Que Rei Sou Eu? (89), such as Pichot/Lucien, this being his first role of greatest impact and repercussion, making pair with Cláudia Abreu (Juliette). He followed other works such as Perigosas Peruas (92), as the puzzled Paulinho Pamonha and O Mapa da Mina (93), as Raul Gouveia. In addition to these novels, Fera Radical (88), like Paxá, and Mico Preto (90), like Adolfo, son of Áurea (Márcia Real).

In 1994, he made another of his best roles, the novel Quatro por Quatro (94), as the hypochondriac Alcebíades, better known as Alce. Her character initially made pair with Auxiliadora (Elizabeth Savalla), and this one discovers that he betrayed her with Elisa Maria (Lizandra Souto). He then made the novel O Fim do Mundo (96), as Vadeco, and later made three novels alongside Betty Lago: O Amor Está no Ar (97), as Filipe, Pecado Capital (98), as Valdir and Uga-Uga (2000), as Anísio.

In 2002, he made for the first time a novel by Antônio Calmon, O Beijo do Vampiro (2002), as the hilarious Bartô, pairing with Betty Gofman (Amélie) and starring for the first time with his uncle Luis Gustavo (Galileu), both playing father and son in the plot. Soon, in 2004, he made the miniseries Um Só Coração (2004), as Paulo Prado, and the novel Como uma Onda (2004), as the womanizer Pedroca do Espírito Santo, and in 2006, in double dose for the second time, (2006), as Júlio Soares in Páginas da Vida (2006), as Leandro, son of Tide (Tarcísio Meira) and Lalinha (Glória Menezes).

In 2008, in double dose for the third time, it makes the miniseries Queridos Amigos (2008), like Fernando, and Três Irmãs (2008), like Orlando, making pair with Beth Goulart (Leonora). He then remakes Ti Ti Ti (2010) as Breno Rodrigues, and then made O Astro (2011), as the unscrupulous Amin Hayalla, married to Jamile (Carolina Kasting), but who has an affair with lover Sílvia (Bel Kutner).

In 2012, has been in Cheias de Charme, as the villain Dr. Sarmento. In 2013, he was in Sangue Bom as Franklin Cardoso.

In 2017, he played Pedro Malan in the film Real: O Plano por Trás da História.

Personal life 
He is married to the designer Mariana da Silva Telles, and father of Pedro Gabus Mendes and Luisa Gabus Mendes.

Filmography

Television

Film
 2017 - Real - O Plano Por Trás da História - Pedro Malan

References

External links 

1959 births
Living people
Male actors from São Paulo
Brazilian male television actors
Brazilian male telenovela actors
Brazilian male film actors
Brazilian male stage actors